Campagnac is the name or part of the name of the following communes in France:

 Campagnac, Aveyron, in the Aveyron department
 Campagnac, Tarn, in the Tarn department
 Campagnac-lès-Quercy, in the Dordogne department